ŽFK Spartak Subotica (Serbian Cyrillic: ЖФК Спартак Суботица) is women's football team from Subotica, Serbia. The team has won ten national championships, including nine in a row from 2011 to 2019. It also has appeared in the UEFA Women's Champions League.

History
In May 1970 employees of the railway company Željezničar established a women's football club of the same name in Subotica, which became a member of the sports association Jovan Mikic Spartak. ŽFK Željezničar won the first Yugoslavia women's football league in 1975. The team was later renamed Spartak, and following the break-up of Yugoslavia it played the Serbian League.

In 2011, forty years after the club's creation, Spartak won its second championship, and in the next two seasons it won both the championship and the national cup. The team couldn't make it past the qualifying round in its UEFA Champions League debut, but in its two following appearances it reached the Round of 32.

Titles
 1 Yugoslav League: 1974–75
 12 Serbian Leagues: 2010–11, 2011–12, 2012–13, 2013–14, 2014–15, 2015–16, 2016–17, 2017-18, 2018-19, 2019-20, 2020-21, 2021-22
 7 Serbian Cups: 2011–12, 2012–13, 2013–14, 2014-15, 2015-16, 2016-17, 2018-19

Current squad
 As of August 2021 according to UEFA's website.
 Flags indicate national team as defined under FIFA eligibility rules. Players may hold more than one non-FIFA nationality.

Former internationals
For details of current and former players, see :Category:ŽFK Spartak Subotica players.

  Serbia: Jelena Čanković, Jelena Čubrilo, Nevena Damjanović, Liljana Gordijan, Marija Ilić, Ana Ivanova, Tijana Krstić, Vesna Milivojević, Nikoleta Nikolić, Allegra Poljak, Marija Radojičić, Aleksandra Savanović, Ana Stojanović, Mirela Tenkov
  Bosnia and Herzegovina: Amela Fetahović, Milena Nikolić
  Cameroon: Gaëlle Enganamouit, Adrienne Iven, Jeannette Yango, Claudine Meffometou
  Chinese Taipei: Tseng Shu-o
  Equatorial Guinea: Dorine Chuigoué 
  Ghana: Elizabeth Addo, Priscilla Okyere
  Ivory Coast: Josée Nahi, Ines Nrehy
  Montenegro: Željka Radanović
  North Macedonia: Eli Jakovska, Simona Krstanovska, Aleksandra Markovska
  Russia: Yekaterina Gokhman

UEFA Competitions Record
In their first European season the team finished second and failed to qualify for the knock-out stage. In their next season they too finished second but moved on to the round of 32 as one of the two best second-placed teams.

Top scorers in UEFA competitions

References

External links
Club's website

Women's football clubs in Serbia
Sport in Subotica
1970 establishments in Serbia